Valea Adâncă River may refer to:
 Valea Adâncă, a tributary of the Danube–Black Sea Canal in Constanța County, Romania
 Valea Adâncă, a tributary of the Greci in Tulcea County, Romania